Charisma is an album by jazz trumpeter Lee Morgan featuring performances by Morgan, Jackie McLean, Hank Mobley, Cedar Walton, Paul Chambers and Billy Higgins, recorded on September 29, 1966, but not released label until 1969, on the Blue Note.

Reception
The AllMusic review by Scott Yanow awarded the album 4 stars stating: "The three horns, all of whom sound quite individual, each have their exciting moments, and the results are quintessential mid-'60s hard bop."

Track listing 
All compositions by Lee Morgan, except where indicated.
 "Hey Chico" - 7:17
 "Somethin' Cute" - 5:39
 "Rainy Night" (Walton) - 5:39
 "Sweet Honey Bee" (Pearson) - 6:54
 "The Murphy Man" - 7:34
 "The Double Up" - 6:01

Personnel 
 Lee Morgan - trumpet
 Jackie McLean - alto saxophone
 Hank Mobley - tenor saxophone
 Cedar Walton - piano
 Paul Chambers - bass
 Billy Higgins - drums

References 

1969 albums
Hard bop albums
Lee Morgan albums
Blue Note Records albums
Albums produced by Francis Wolff
Albums recorded at Van Gelder Studio